Adam Zkt. Eva  (Adam zoekt Eva, Dutch for Adam seeks Eve) is a Dutch reality television relationship show produced by Reinout Oerlemans which first aired in 2014, on RTL 5. The show's novelty is that all participants are naked, with an additional twist in that a second candidate (also naked) is introduced halfway through the program to compete for the main character's affections. Presenter and former model Nicolette Kluijver, who left BNN, hosts the program. Season 1 of the show contained 8 episodes, and was shot in the Pacific Ocean, on Mogo Mogo Island of the Pearl Islands, Panama. Season 2 also contained 8 episodes, and was shot on Matinloc Island, Palawan, the Philippines.

Because of its depiction of nudity the show attracted controversy. A reviewer for de Volkskrant was not impressed and called it just another dating show (instead of the advertised "unique love experiment"). Tweets by Dutch TV personalities expressed mainly surprise.

International versions 

The format has been sold to producers in various European countries.

A Spanish version Adán y Eva, shot in Croatia and hosted by Mónica Martínez, premiered on Cuatro on 21 October 2014. The show was renewed for a second season, which was shot in the Philippines.

The German adaptation Adam sucht Eva premiered on 28 August 2014 on RTL Television. The six episodes of the first season were shot on Tikehau and hosted by Nela Lee.

A French version Adam recherche Ève premiered on 3 March 2015 on D8 and hosted by Caroline Ithurbide.

A Danish version Adam og Eva shot in Greece started to air on 21 January 2015 on TV3.

A Finnish adaptation Aatami etsii Eevaa also shot in Greece premiered on 6 April 2015 on Nelonen.

DeeJay TV produced in autumn 2015 the Italian version as L'isola di Adamo ed Eva, with Vladimir Luxuria as host.

Hungarian Ádám keresi Évát was broadcast in eight episodes on Viasat 3 from April 25 to June 10, 2016.

Portuguese "Adão e Eva" was broadcast in eight episodes on the SIC Radical Portuguese channel from April 2016.

Voice overs and subtitles
The original Dutch version with a Polish voice-over titled Adam szuka Ewy (Polish for Adam seeks Eve) debuted on Polish TLC on February 3, 2015.

The original Dutch version with English subtitles began broadcasting in Australia on SBS2 on 13 March 2015 as "Adam Looking for Eve", and was rebroadcast starting in May 2016.

The original Dutch version with Portuguese subtitles began broadcasting in Portugal on SIC Radical in April 2016 as "Adam Looking for Eve", with the second season being broadcast in May.

See also
Dating Naked, an American naked dating show

References

External links
Show website

Dating and relationship reality television series
Dutch game shows
2014 Dutch television series debuts
Nudity in television
Obscenity controversies in television
Television controversies in the Netherlands
RTL 5 original programming